MiTAC Holdings Corporation, through its subsidiaries (MiTAC International Corp. and MiTAC Computing Technology), provides GPS navigation devices, automotive solution, cloud services and cloud computing products worldwide. The company offers a range of electronics manufacturing services, such as research and development, design, manufacturing, assembly, marketing, and solutions. It also distributes portable car navigation products, outdoor handheld navigation devices, and mobile GPS solutions; and DashCam for vehicles, portable navigation devices for 4WD, and trucks under the Magellan, Mio, and Navman brand names. In addition, the company designs, manufactures, and markets x86 server/workstation platforms to OEMs, VARs, system integrators, and resellers under the TYAN brand name. Further, it offers storage products, cloud computing applications, all-in-one PC, thin client, and POS system, as well as smart wearable device and professional tablet series. MiTAC Holdings Corporation is based in Taipei, Taiwan.

History 
 2013: Through a 100% stock swap from MiTAC International Corp., MiTAC Holdings Corporation was established on September 12 and listed and traded on Taiwan Stock Exchange under stock code 3706.
 2014: MiTAC International Corp span off the Cloud Computing Business Group to MiTAC Computing Technology Corp.(MCT) and MCT was formally operated on September 1.

Subsidiaries 
 Asia: MiTAC International Corp. Lin Kou Office, MiTAC International Corp. Nangang Office, MiTAC International Corp. Hsin-Chu Factory, MiTAC Computing Technology Corporation, MiTAC Computer (Kunshan) CO., Ltd., MiTAC Computer (ShunDe) Ltd., MiTAC Research (Shanghai) Ltd., MiTAC Japan Corp., MiTAC Service (Shanghai) CO., Ltd
 USA: MiTAC Digital Corporation, MiTAC Information Systems Corp. , Tyan Computer Corporation
Oddzial w Polsce
 Oceania:MiTAC Australia Pty Ltd., Navman Technology NZ Ltd.

Investments
 US:Synnex - 17%

References

Taiwanese companies established in 2013
Technology companies established in 2013
Navigation system companies
Video surveillance companies
Electronics companies of Taiwan
Taiwanese brands